Schultice Mountain is a mountain located in the Catskill Mountains of New York south-southwest of Grand Gorge. Hack Flats is located south and Irish Mountain is located north of Schultice Mountain.

References

Mountains of Delaware County, New York
Mountains of New York (state)